The Adventures of Snugglepot & Cuddlepie and Little Ragged Blossom is a musical with book and lyrics by John Clarke with Doug MacLeod and music and additional lyrics by Alan John. It is based on the Snugglepot and Cuddlepie books created by Australian author May Gibbs.

Synopsis 
The story centres on the two characters of Snugglepot and Cuddlepie, who befriend a Blossom and search the unknown land of Australia. Unlike other adaptations, this version is a political satire.

Production 
It premiered at the Theatre Royal in Sydney on 9 January 2007, presented by Windmill Performing Arts and Company B in association with the Sydney Festival, Perth International Arts Festival and Adelaide Festival Centre. Adult actors played the parts of the gumnut babies - Darren Gilshenan (Cuddlepie), Tim Richards (Snugglepot) and Ursula Yovich (Ragged Blossom).

Songs

Act l 

 Season of Love in the Bush
 Mates
 Are We There Yet?
 Lizard's Rock (Be Clever and Resourceful)
 Are We There Yet? (reprise)
 Top of the Tree
 The Bushland Rap
 Lost and Found
 How Do You Speak to a Girl?
 Eucalyptus Blues
 Are We There Yet? (reprise)

Act ll 

 The Call of the Sea
 Bein' Bad's Great
 Great Escape
 We Need to Get Serious (Deadibones)
 Confusing
 Safely Home
 They're Nothing Without Me
 Are We There Yet? (reprise)
 Clash of the Reptiles
 Lost and Found

Cast

Awards 
The musical was nominated for 2007 Helpmann Awards for Best New Australian Work, Best Presentation for Children and Best Costume Design.

References

Australian musicals
2007 musicals
Compositions by Alan John